Emma Lake or Lake Emma may refer to:

Emma Lake, Saskatchewan, a community in Saskatchewan
Emma Lake (Saskatchewan), a lake in Saskatchewan
Lake Emma (South Dakota), a lake in North Dakota

See also
Emma Lake Artist's Workshops
Lake Emma Township, Hubbard County, Minnesota